Aldo Jara (born 25 April 1984) is a Paraguayan former professional footballer who played as a forward.

Career
Jara was born in Asunción, Paraguay. He competed at the South American Under-17 Football Championship with the Paraguay U17 national team and became top scorer of the tournament. In November 2003, while at his first club Cerro Porteño he stopped attending training and club officials were unable to locate him. This came after he was left out the Paraguay U20 national team squad for the 2003 FIFA World Youth Championship.

In August 2008, Jara joined Peruvian side FBC Melgar.

In July 2009, Jara trialled with Spanish Segunda División club FC Cartagena.

References

External links
 

1984 births
Living people
Association football forwards
Paraguayan footballers
Paraguay youth international footballers
Cerro Porteño players
Club Guaraní players
Coquimbo Unido footballers
Club Universitario de Deportes footballers
Club Sol de América footballers
FBC Melgar footballers
Paraguayan expatriate footballers
Expatriate footballers in Chile
Expatriate footballers in Peru